Dear Old Pal of Mine is a World War I song written by Harold Robe and Gitz Rice. The song was first published in 1916 by G. Ricordi & Co. in New York, NY.

Irish tenor John McCormack earned the nickname the "Singing Prophet of Victory" by popularizing this wartime song. It was in the top 20 from January to March 1919 and reached number 10 in February.
 
The idea for the song, according to an editorial note on the sheet music, was conceived by Rice while on sentry duty at the front lines at Ypres, Belgium.

References 

Bibliography
Parker, Bernard S. World War I Sheet Music 1. Jefferson: McFarland & Company, Inc., 2007. . 
Paas, John Roger. 2014. America sings of war: American sheet music from World War I. . 
Tyler, Don. Hit songs, 1900-1955: American popular music of the pre-rock era. Jefferson, N.C.: McFarland, 2007. . 
Vogel, Frederick G. World War I Songs: A History and Dictionary of Popular American Patriotic Tunes, with Over 300 Complete Lyrics. Jefferson: McFarland & Company, Inc., 1995. .

External links 
 Sheet music and Song MP3 at the Illinois Digital Archive 

Songs about friendship
Songs about loneliness
1916 songs
Songs of World War I
Songs written by Gitz Rice